The  College World Series was the fourth NCAA-sanctioned baseball tournament that determined a national champion.  The tournament was held as the conclusion of the 1950 NCAA baseball season and was played at Johnny Rosenblatt Stadium in Omaha, Nebraska from June 15 to June 23.  It was the first College World Series to be held at the stadium, which hosted the event through 2010.  The tournament's champion was the Texas Longhorns, coached by Bibb Falk.  The Most Outstanding Player was Ray VanCleef of Rutgers.  The championship was the second consecutive for the Longhorns.

The tournament consisted of no preliminary round of play, as teams were selected directly into the College World Series.  From 1947 to 1949, there likewise was no preliminary round, as the teams were chosen based on committee selections, conference champions, and district playoffs. From 1954 to the present, teams compete in the NCAA Division I baseball tournament preliminary round(s), to determine the eight teams that play in the College World Series.

Participants

Results

Bracket

Game results

Notable players
 Alabama: John Baumgartner, Frank Lary, Al Lary, Guy Morton, Jr., Ed White, Al Worthington
 Bradley: Bill Tuttle, Andy Varga
 Colorado A&M: Don “Lefty” Straub' 
 Rutgers: Hardy Peterson
 Texas: Charlie Gorin, Kal Segrist, Murray Wall
 Tufts: Bud Niles, George Minot, Ed Schluntz, Dave Lincoln
 Washington State: Gene Conley, Ted Tappe
 Wisconsin: Thornton Kipper, Red Wilson

Tournament notes
Texas became the first team to win two consecutive College World Series.
Jim Ehler threw the first no-hitter in College World Series history.

Notes

References

College World Series
College World Series
College World Series
College World Series
Baseball competitions in Omaha, Nebraska
College baseball tournaments in Nebraska